Ichalkaranji was a Lok Sabha parliamentary constituency of Maharashtra. It was merged into Hatkanangle constituency after delimitation in 2008

Members of Parliament

See also
 Hatkanangle Lok Sabha constituency
 Ichalkaranji
 List of Constituencies of the Lok Sabha

References

Former Lok Sabha constituencies of Maharashtra
Former constituencies of the Lok Sabha
2008 disestablishments in India
Constituencies disestablished in 2008